Jawahar Navodaya Vidyalaya, Kothipura Bilaspur or locally known as JNV Kothipura is a boarding, co-educational school in Bilaspur district of Himachal Pradesh state in India. Navodaya Vidyalayas are funded by the Indian Ministry of Human Resources Development and administered  by Navodaya Vidyalaya Smiti, an autonomous body under the ministry.

History 
The school was established in August 1992, and is a part of Jawahar Navodaya Vidyalaya schools. The school was initially established at Ghumarwin and shifted to Berthin in January, 1995 and finally moved to the permanent campus in 2000. The permanent campus of this school is located near Kothipura, Bilaspur. This school is administered and monitored by Chandigarh regional office of Navodaya Vidyalaya Smiti.

Admission 
Admission to JNV Bilaspur at class VI level is made through selection test conducted by Navodaya Vidyalaya Smiti. The information about test is disseminated and advertised in the district by the office of Bilaspur district magistrate (Collector), who is also chairperson of Vidyalya Management Committee.

Affiliations 
JNV Bilaspur is affiliated to Central Board of Secondary Education with affiliation number 640009, following the curriculum prescribed by CBSE.

See also 

 List of JNV schools
 Jawahar Navodaya Vidyalaya, Sirmaur
 Jawahar Navodaya Vidyalaya, Anantnag

References

External links 

 Official Website of JNV Bilaspur, Himachal Pradesh

High schools and secondary schools in Himachal Pradesh
Bilaspur
Educational institutions established in 1992
1992 establishments in Himachal Pradesh
Bilaspur district, Himachal Pradesh